Henry Meynell (24 August 1789 – 24 March 1865) was a British Conservative and Tory politician and naval officer.

Family and early life
Meynell was the second son of Hugo Meynell of Quorndon Hall, Leicestershire—himself son of his namesake, Hugo Meynell—and Elizabeth Ingram née Shepheard, daughter of Charles Ingram, 9th Viscount of Irvine. He was educated at Harrow School from 1797, alongside John Spencer, 3rd Earl Spencer.

Naval career
In 1803, he entered the Royal Navy as a first-class volunteer, initially serving on the Isis in Newfoundland until 1805. He gradually rose up the ranks, first to midshipman in 1805, on the Pomone and Captain at Lisbon and home, as well on the Boreas and Lavinia in British waters and the Mediterranean.  

He was then elevated lieutenant in 1809, where he joined the Theban in 1810, assisting with the capture of a French merchant brig near Dieppe in 1811, and then surviving the ship's wreck in 1812 during a storm while it was en route to India. Shortly after, he was nominated acting commander of the Arrogant at Bombay, and then made commander of the Cornwallis in 1813. Later that year, he was made acting captain of the Jupiter, before moving to the Newcastle in 1815, where he was confirmed as  captain in 1816. During this latter period, he is said to have attracted the attention of Napoleon, whom Meynell described as having "refined manners and gentlemanly bearing, joined with the frankness and openness of a sailor". 

He was seemingly paid off in September 1817, and then never returned to the seas despite expressing an interest to do so in 1821. However, by 1851, he was appointed as a rear-admiral, and then rose further to vice-admiral in 1857, and admiral in 1862.

Political career
The cessation of his naval career led to Meynell being appointed as a gentleman usher quarterly waiter to George IV upon his coronation, with likely thanks due to Francis Ingram-Seymour-Conway, 2nd Marquess of Hertford, the Lord Chamberlain, and his wife, the regent's mistress.  

During this period, he generally voted against Catholic relief and against the repeal of the Test Acts, and was mistakenly expected to vote for Catholic emancipation, when he in fact cast his vote in the opposite way on at least three occasions. 

Upon his retirement, he lived a "quite, unobtrusive life", eventually dying at the Grand Hotel du Louvre, Paris in March 1865, and then buried at the family vault in Ashley, Staffordshire.

References

External links
 

UK MPs 1826–1830
UK MPs 1830–1831
UK MPs 1831–1832
UK MPs 1832–1835
UK MPs 1835–1837
UK MPs 1837–1841
UK MPs 1841–1847
Irish Conservative Party MPs
Tory MPs (pre-1834)
1789 births
1865 deaths
People educated at Harrow School
Royal Navy officers